United FC, United F.C., F.C. United, or United Football Club may refer to

Atlanta United FC, an American soccer team
Carlisle United F.C., a professional football club based in Carlisle, Cumbria, England
Chicago FC United, an American soccer team
Colchester United F.C., a professional football club based in the town of Colchester, Essex, England
F.C. United of Manchester, semi-professional football club based in Moston, Manchester, England
Kerala United FC, an Indian professional football club based in Kozhikode, Kerala
Leeds United F.C., a professional football club based in Leeds, West Yorkshire, England
Loudoun United FC, an American soccer team
Minnesota United FC, an American soccer team
Newcastle United FC, an English professional football club based in Newcastle upon Tyne, Tyne and Wear
Oxford United FC, an English professional football club based in the city of Oxford, Oxfordshire, England
Peterborough United FC, a professional football club in Peterborough, Cambridgeshire, England
Picola United Football Club, an Australian Rules Football club based in the small Victorian town of Picola
San Juan United FC, a Puerto Rican soccer team
Sheffield United FC, a professional football club in Sheffield, South Yorkshire, England
Southend United F.C., a professional association football club based in Southend-on-Sea, Essex, England
Torquay United F.C., a professional football club based in Torquay, Devon, England
United F.C. (Bahamas), a football club based in Nassau
United F.C. (South Africa), a South African soccer club
United Football Club, an Australian rules football team in the Adelaide Plains Football League
West Ham United FC, an English professional football club based in Stratford, East London
York United FC, a Canadian professional soccer club based in Toronto, Ontario